As  Television Broadcasts Limited (TVB) is Hong Kong's largest television station, the television programmes it broadcasts form a major part of popular culture in Hong Kong. TVB programmes have major social and culture effects on the Hong Kong populace, influencing fashion, hairstyles, speech patterns and public attitudes. Its programmes have been and continue to be exported to many Chinese-speaking communities around the world; such as Mainland China, Taiwan, Macau, Singapore, Malaysia, Philippines, Japan, United States, Canada, Australia, South Korea, India and most of Europe (including England), via satellite, video cassettes and now VCDs and DVDs.

TV drama series
See Lists of TVB dramas and series

Live-Action TV shows

Chinese Live-Action
Journey to the West 1986 
The Legend of Haolan 皓镧传 (Jade)

Japanese Live-Action
1 Litre of Tears (Jade)
Bambino! (Jade)
Daitokai (Pearl)
Galileo 神探伽利略 (Jade)
Great Teacher Onizuka (Jade)
Oooku 大奧 (Jade)
The Prince of Tennis (Jade)

Japanese Tokusatsu 
Super Sentai series 超級戰隊系列 
Ultraman series 超人系列 (Tiga-Mebius)
Kamen Rider series 幪面超人系列 (Ryuki-Gaim)

American Live-Action
20/20 (Pearl)
The 4400 (Pearl)
Alcatraz (Pearl)
Amazing Stories (Pearl)
American Experience (Pearl)
America's Funniest Home Videos (Pearl)
America's Next Top Model (Pearl)
Animal World (Pearl)
Benson (Pearl)
The Best Times (Pearl)
Boston Public (Pearl)
The Bozo Show (Pearl)
Breaking Bad 絕命毒師
Bret Maverick (Pearl)
Captain Power and the Soldiers of the Future (Pearl)
Charlie's Angels (Pearl)
Cheers (Pearl)
Civil Wars (Pearl)
Combat Missions (Pearl)
The Cosby Show (Pearl)
Dallas (Pearl)
Dark Angel (Pearl)
A Different World (Pearl)
Dinah! (Pearl)
Dinosaurs (Pearl)
Doogie Howser, M.D. (Pearl)
Drexell's Class (Pearl)
Dynasty (Pearl)
ER (Pearl)
The Fall Guy (Pearl)
The Family Man (Pearl)
Family Ties (Pearl)
Felicity (Pearl)
Firestarter: Rekindled (Pearl)
Freaks and Geeks (Pearl)
Free Spirit (Pearl)
The Fresh Prince of Bel-Air (Pearl)
Glitter (Pearl)
Good Advice (Pearl)
Hardcastle and McCormick (Pearl)
Head of the Class (Pearl)
Hearts Afire (Pearl)
Heroes (Pearl)
Home Improvement (Pearl)
Hour of Power (Pearl)
iCarly 愛卡莉 
Island Son (Pearl)
Jackass 死蠢鬥一番 (J2)
The Jersey (Pearl)
Just the Ten of Us (Pearl)
Kate & Allie (Pearl)
Las Vegas (Pearl)
The Magical World of Disney (Pearl)
Magnum, P.I. (Pearl)
The Mary Tyler Moore Show (Pearl)
Max Headroom (Pearl)
Me and the Boys (Pearl)
Medium
Modern Family 行屍 (Pearl)
Murphy Brown
Mr. Belvedere (Pearl)
The Muppet Show (Pearl)
My Two Dads (Pearl)
Naked Science (Pearl)
Now and Again (Pearl)
NYPD Blue (Pearl)
Once and Again (Pearl)
Parenthood (Pearl)
Parker Lewis Can't Lose (Pearl)
Party of Five (Pearl)
Prison Break (Pearl)
Private Benjamin (Pearl)
Queer Eye (Pearl)
Quincy, M.E. (Pearl)
Rhoda (Pearl)
Riptide (Pearl)
Rituals (Pearl)
Roseanne (Pearl)
The Secret Circle 魔環 (J2)
Seinfeld (Pearl)
Simon & Simon (Pearl)
Small Wonder (Pearl)
Solid Gold (Pearl)
Something Is Out There (Pearl)
Spin City (Pearl)
Standoff (Pearl)
Suddenly Susan (Pearl)
That's Incredible! (Pearl)
Totally Hidden Video (Pearl)
Tru Calling (Pearl)
Ugly Betty (Pearl)
The Walking Dead (Pearl)
Webster (Pearl)
The West Wing (Pearl)
Wild, Wild World of Animals (Pearl)
Wiseguy (Pearl)
Wish You Were Here (Pearl)
Who's the Boss? (Pearl)
Without a Trace (Pearl)
The X-Files (Pearl)

Australian Live-Action
The Big Byte (Pearl)
The Castaways (Pearl)
Ferry Boat Fred (Pearl)
Five Mile Creek (Pearl)
Hey Dad..! (Pearl)
Neighbours (Pearl)
Spyforce (Pearl)
Talkin' 'Bout Your Generation (Pearl)

British Live-Action
After Henry (Pearl)
At Home with the Braithwaites (Pearl)
The Benny Hill Show (Pearl)
Big Cat Diary (Pearl)
The Bill (Pearl)
Cutting Edge (Pearl)
Delia's How to Cook (Pearl)
Executive Stress (Pearl)
Father, Dear Father (Pearl)
Gems (Pearl)
Heroes Unmasked (Pearl)
Hogg's Back (Pearl)
Horizon (Pearl)
Hotel Babylon (Pearl)
Human Universe (Pearl)
Jekyll (Pearl)
Jim Henson's The Storyteller (Pearl)
Just Good Friends (Pearl)
Merlin of the Crystal Cave (Pearl)
Minder (Pearl)
Monarch of the Glen (Pearl)
The Naked Chef (Pearl)
No Place Like Home (Pearl)
Oliver's Twist (Pearl)
Only Fools and Horses (Pearl)
Rising Damp (Pearl)
Sinbad (Pearl)
Slinger's Day (Pearl)
The Thin Blue Line (Pearl)
UFO (Pearl)

Canadian Live-Action
The Campbells (Pearl)
Captain Power and the Soldiers of the Future (Pearl)
Danger Bay (Pearl)
The Doodlebops (Pearl)
Falcon Beach 青春沙灘 (Pearl)
Murdoch Mysteries (Pearl)
Night Heat (Pearl)
The Red Green Show (Pearl)
Republic of Doyle 多伊爾共和國 (Pearl)
Wingin' It 天使新人王 (Pearl)

Filipino Live-Action
Juan dela Cruz (J2)

Indian Live-Action
Aashram (Jade)
Alif Laila (Jade)
Mahabharat 摩訶婆羅多 (Jade)
Ramayan (Jade)
Shaktimaan (Jade)
Yeh Rishta Kya Kehlata Hai (Jade)

Korean Live-Action
Full House 浪漫滿屋 (Jade)
Jewel in the Palace 大長今 (Jade)
The Way of Medicine 醫道 (Jade)
Scent of a Woman (Jade)

Taiwanese Live-Action
Justice Pao

Telemovies
(This is a complete list.)
Behind the Beauty 孽海狂花
Behind the Mask 後窗驚魂
The Bird of Prey 天降橫財心驚驚
The Black Bird 黑鳥
BoBoiBoy The Movie 將博伊男孩這部電影
Burden of Proof 天涯追兇
Can't Stop Loving You 愛到盡頭
Class of Disobedience 飛越校園
Cul-De-Sac 親子大綁架
The Dare Devils 特技雙雄
Dark Shadow 懸案追兇
Dead End
Deadly Lovers 奪命情人
Deadly Showdown 滅罪先鋒
Deadly String 妒火線
Death Trap 咫尺疑魂
Dismayed Patriot - The Qu Tuan 屈原
Double Crossing 親密殺機
Double or Nothing 千影神偷
Edge of Justice  律政皇庭
Fatal Assignment
The Final Shot 熱血狙擊
The Fugitives 末路狂奔
The Healing Spirit 冥約
The Heavenly Swordsman and the Spoiled 聖劍天嬌
Iron Butterfly I, II 特警 90
Killer's Code 殺手風雷
The Knight and the Concubine
The Last Conflict 刑警本色
Left Alone 歷劫驚濤
The Mamasan  霓紅姊妹花
Man on the Verge of a Nervous Breakdown 都市風暴
Mary's Choice 瑪莉的抉擇
Out on a Limb 殺之戀
The Quick Step of Passion 紅杏劫
A Secret Mission 熱浪迷情
The Set Up 越柙飛龍
Sharpshooters 廉政英雌
She was Married to the Mob
Special Duties Unit 飛虎雄風
Special Duties Unit 1996 飛虎雄風 II 之搶灘行動
Story of Nam 難民營風暴
A Story of Two Drifters 末路危情
Taxi 810 的士810 I, II, III
Those Were the Days 歲月情真
The Thief 賊至尊
The Thief of Time 群星會
The Threat 血殺
Till Death, Us Do Part 魅影迷情
Tulips In August 八月鬱金香
Unbearable Heights 鐵翼驚情
The Undercover 越柙飛龍II - 虎穴潛龍
Unusual Revenge 殲滅行動
Where's my Gun? 失鎗四十八小時

Animation

Hong Kong cartoons
The Adventures of Hello Kitty & Friends 愛漫遊
The Legend of Condor Hero (卡通) 神鵰俠侶  (Parts I and II with 26 episodes each)
My Life as McDull 麥兜故事
Old Master Q 老夫子
Professor Panda Says 成語動畫廊
Xianqi Master

Japanese anime 
21 Emon 21-宇宙
Aikatsu! 星夢學園
Alfred J. Kwak
Animal Yokocho 動物橫町
Appare-Ranman!
Ashita no Nadja 妮嘉尋親記
Astro Boy 小飛俠阿童木
Atashin'chi 我們這一家
Bakugan Battle Brawlers
Battle B-Daman B傳說戰鬥彈珠人
Battle Spirits series
Black Jack 怪醫黑傑克
Black Lagoon 黑礁
Bleach 漂靈
Blue Dragon 藍龍
Bomberman Bom Bom 彈珠人
Canaan 迦南 (J2)
Captain Tsubasa 足球小將
Cardcaptor Sakura 百變小櫻魔法卡
Chibi Maruko-chan 櫻桃小丸子
Chinpui 超級大耳鼠
Chuka Ichiban 中華一番
City Hunter 城市獵人
Code Geass 叛逆的魯魯修
Crayon Shin-chan 蜡笔小新
Creamy Mami, the Magic Angel 小忌廉
Crush Gear Turbo 激鬥戰車
Cyborg Kuro-chan 超级小黑咪
Death Note 死亡筆記
Detective Conan 名偵探柯南
Digimon series 數碼暴龍
Doraemon 多啦A夢 (originally named 叮噹)
Dr. Slump IQ博士
Dragonball Z series 龍珠系列
Duel Masters 決鬥大師
Eden of the East 東之伊甸
Esper Mami 超級力魔美
Eyeshield 21 衝鋒21
Evangelion 新世紀福音戰士 (Jade & HDJ)
F
Fables of the Green Forest
Fairy Musketeers 俏皮劍俠小紅帽
Fairy Tail 魔導少年
Fighting Foodons 功夫小食神
Full Moon wo Sagashite 尋找滿月
Fullmetal Alchemist 鋼之鍊金術師
Fushigi Yuugi 不思議游戲
Fushigiboshi no Futagohime 雙子公主
Galaxy Railways 銀河鐵道物語
Game Center Arashi 電子神童
GeGeGe no Kitaro 
Gin Tama 銀魂 (J2)
Goldfish Warning! 娛樂金魚眼
Gundam series 機動戰士高達系列
Hamtaro 哈姆太郎
Hans Christian Andersen
Hayate no Gotoku 旋風管家
Hungry Heart Wild Striker 野驁射手
Hunter × Hunter 全職獵人
InuYasha 犬夜叉
Inazuma Eleven 閃電十一人
Inazuma Eleven GO 閃電十一人GO
 Jewelpet series 寶石寵物
K-On! 輕音少女 (J2)
Kaibutsu Kun 怪物小王子
Kaichou wa Maid-Sama! 會長是女僕大人! (J2)
Kaitou Saint Tail 圣少女
Kaleido Star 星夢美少女
Kamichama Karin 小女神花铃
Kamikaze Kaitou Jeanne 神風怪盜貞德
Kirarin Revolution 花漾明星
Kiteretsu Daihyakka 奇天烈大百科
Kobato. 奇蹟少女KOBATO.
Kuroshitsuji 黒執事 (J2)
Madö King Granzört 魔動王
Mahoujin Guru Guru 咕嚕咕嚕魔法陣
Mama Loves the Poyopoyo-Saurus BB保你大
Maple Town
Maya the Honey Bee
MegaMan NT Warrior series 網路英雄洛克人
The Melancholy of Haruhi Suzumiya 涼宮春日的憂鬱 (J2)
Mermaid Melody Pichi Pichi Pitch 唱K小魚仙
Mirmo! 魔法小米路
Mitsume ga Toru 三眼小子
Mojacko 外星毛查查
Moomin
The Mythical Detective Loki Ragnarok 魔偵探洛基
Nadia: The Secret of Blue Water 冒險少女娜汀亞
Nana
Naruto 火影忍者 (tvbQ)
Neighborhood Story 近所物語
Nichijou 日常 (J2)
Nintama Rantarō 忍者亂太郎
Ninja Hattori-Kun 忍者小靈精
Obake no Q-tarō Q太郎
Oh My Goddess! 幸運女神
Ojamajo Doremi 小魔女Doremi
Onegai My Melody 奇幻魔法Melody
Onmyō Taisenki 陰陽大戰記
Ouran High School Host Club 櫻蘭高校男公關部
Pandora Hearts 潘多拉之心
Parasol Henbē
Patlabor 機動警察
Perman 小超人帕門
Pokémon 寵物小精靈 (Original Series through XY)
Pretty Cure series 光之美少女系列
Pro Golf Saru 高爾夫球手猿
Ranma ½ 亂馬1/2
Saber Marionette J to X
Saber Rider and the Star Sheriffs
Sailor Moon 美小女戰士
Saiunkoku Monogatari 彩雲國物語
Samurai Pizza Cats
School Rumble 惡搞校園 (J2)
Seven of Seven 七小花
Sgt. Frog Keroro 軍曹
Sherlock Hound
Shugo Chara! 守護甜心
Skip-Beat! 華麗的挑戰
Slam Dunk 灌籃高手
Sonic X 超音鼠X
Special A 特优生
Sugar Sugar Rune 魔界女王候補生
Samurai Shodown Series 侍魂 (Pearl)
Tamagotchi! 寵物反斗星 (First series and the first four episodes of Yume Kira Dream Only)
Taro the Space Alien 我的ET同學
Tokyo Magnitude 8.0 東京地震8.0 (J2)
Tokyo Mew Mew 東京喵喵
Tonde Buurin 飛天小女豬事丁
Tottemo! Luckyman 行運超人
Tsubasa: Reservoir Chronicle 翼之奇幻旅程
Ultra Maniac 魔法留学生
Urusei Yatsura 山T女福星
Vampire Knight 吸血鬼騎士 (J2)
Viewtiful Joe 完美超人JOE
Virtua Fighter
Wedding Peach 婚紗小天使
Working!! 無聊西餐廳 (J2)
Wowser 零蛋多毛狗 
Yakitate!! Japan 日式面包王
You're Under Arrest series 皇家雙妹嘜系列
Yu Yu Hakusho 幽遊白書
Yume no Crayon Oukoku 蠟筆小王國
Zatch Bell!

American cartoons
The 13 Ghosts of Scooby-Doo (Pearl)
101 Dalmatians: The Series (Pearl)
3-2-1 Penguins (Pearl)
Action Man (Pearl)
The Addams Family (Pearl)
Adventures from the Book of Virtues (Pearl)
The Adventures of Jimmy Neutron: Boy Genius (Pearl)
The Adventures of Mickey and Donald (Pearl)
The Adventures of Rocky and Bullwinkle and Friends (Pearl)
The Adventures of Teddy Ruxpin (Pearl)
Adventure Time (Pearl)
Aladdin (Pearl)
Alice's Wonderland Bakery (Pearl)
Alienators: Evolution Continues (Pearl)
The All New Popeye Hour (Pearl)
The Amazing World of Gumball (Pearl)
Amigo and Friends (Pearl)
Amphibia (J2)
Angela Anaconda (Pearl)
The Angry Beavers (Pearl)
Animaniacs (Pearl and Jade)
Animated Tales of the World (Jade) 童心看世界
The Archie and Sabrina Show (Pearl)
Archie's TV Funnies (Pearl)
Archie's Weird Mysteries (Pearl)
Avatar: The Last Airbender (Jade) 降世神通
The Baby Huey Show (Pearl)
Baby Looney Tunes (Pearl)
Baby Shark's Big Show! (Pearl)
Bratz
The Backyardigans (Pearl)
Batman of the Future (Pearl)
Batman: The Animated Series (Pearl)
The Batman (Pearl)
Beetlejuice (Pearl)
Ben 10 (Pearl)
The Berenstain Bears (Pearl)
Best Bugs Forever (Pearl)
Betty Boop (Pearl)
Big Guy and Rusty the Boy Robot (Pearl)
Biker Mice from Mars (Pearl)
Birdman and the Galaxy Trio (Pearl)
The Biskitts (Pearl)
Bobby's World (Pearl)
Bubble Guppies (Pearl)
Bump in the Night (Pearl)
The Busy World of Richard Scarry (Pearl and Jade)
Butch Cassidy and the Sundance Kids (Pearl)
The California Raisin Show (Pearl)
Camp Lazlo (Pearl)
Capitol Critters (Pearl)
Captain Caveman and the Teen Angels (Pearl)
Captain Simian & the Space Monkeys (Pearl)
The Care Bears (Pearl)
Casper and Friends (Pearl)
Casper Classics (Pearl)
CatDog (Pearl)
The Centurions (Pearl)
Challenge of the GoBots (Pearl and Jade)
The Charlie Brown and Snoopy Show (Pearl)
Chip 'n Dale Rescue Rangers (Pearl and Jade) 小松鼠老友記
Clue Club (Pearl)
Codename: Kids Next Door (Pearl)
Courage the Cowardly Dog (Pearl and Jade) 膽小狗英雄
Curious George (Pearl)
Daria (Pearl)
Darkwing Duck (Pearl)
Defenders of the Earth (Pearl)
Dennis the Menace (Pearl)
Denver, the Last Dinosaur (Pearl and Jade)
Devlin (Pearl)
Disney's Adventures of the Gummi Bears (Pearl)
Disney's House of Mouse (Pearl)
Dragon Flyz (Jade)
DuckTales (Pearl and Jade)
Dungeons & Dragons (2004) (Pearl - U.S. version without English subtitles)
Dynomutt (Pearl)
Earthworm Jim (Pearl)
Eek! the Cat (Pearl)
Esme & Roy (Pearl)
Family Dog (Pearl)
Fangface (Pearl)
Fantastic Four (Pearl)
Fantastic Four (Pearl)
The Fairly OddParents (Pearl)
Fat Albert and the Cosby Kids (Pearl)
Festival of Family Classics (Pearl)
Firebuds (Pearl)
Firehouse Tales (Pearl)
The Flintstone Kids (Pearl)
Foster's Home for Imaginary Friends (Pearl)
Free Willy (Pearl)
Frosty the Snowman (Jade - Christmas season only) 雪人FROSTY
The Further Adventures of SuperTed (Pearl)
Futurama (Pearl)
Gadget Boy & Heather (Pearl)
Gadget Boy's Adventures in History (Pearl)
Galaxy High (Pearl and Jade)
Garfield (1990s)
Gargoyles (Pearl)
Gaspard & Lisa (Pearl)
Geronimo Stilton (Pearl)
The Get Along Gang (Pearl)
Ghostbusters (Pearl)
Goldie and Bear (Pearl)
Gravity Falls (Pearl and Jade) 
The Great Grape Ape Show (Pearl)
The Grim Adventures of Billy & Mandy (Pearl)
Gumby (Pearl)
Gumby Adventures (Pearl)
Happily Ever After: Fairy Tales for Every Child (Pearl)
Heathcliff and the Catillac Cats (Pearl)
Heckle & Jeckle (Pearl)
Hello Kitty's Furry Tale Theater (Pearl)
Hercules (Pearl)
Heyyy, It's the King! (Pearl)
Higglytown Heroes (Pearl)
Hi Hi Puffy AmiYumi (Jade) 嗨嗨帕妃亞美由美
How the Grinch Stole Christmas! (Pearl)
Inch High Private Eye (Pearl)
Inspector Gadget (Pearl)
Inspector Gadget's Field Trip (Pearl)
Invader Zim (Pearl)
Invasion America (Pearl)
Iron Man (Pearl)
Itsy Bitsy Spider (Pearl)
Jabberjaw (Pearl)
James Bond Jr. (Pearl)
Jellystone! (Pearl)
The Jetsons (Jade) 傑森一家
Jumanji (Pearl)
Justice League (Pearl)
Kenny the Shark (Pearl)
Ketchup Vampires (Pearl)
The King Kong Show (Pearl)
Laff-A-Lympics (Pearl)
Lassie's Rescue Rangers (Pearl)
Laurel and Hardy (Pearl)
The Legend of Calamity Jane (Pearl)
The Legend of Korra (Jade) 降世神通：寇拉傳奇
The Little Mermaid (Pearl)
The Littles (Pearl)
Lloyd in Space (Pearl)
Looney Tunes (Pearl)
Lucky Luke (Pearl)
Madeline (Pearl)
Maxie's World (Pearl)
Merrie Melodies (Pearl)
The Merrie Melodies Show (Pearl)
MGM Cartoon Classics (Pearl)
Mickey Mouse (TV series) (Pearl)
Mickey Mouse Clubhouse (Pearl)
Mickey Mouse Funhouse (Pearl)
Mighty Mouse: The New Adventures (Pearl)
Monchhichis (Pearl)
Mummies Alive! (Pearl)
Muppet Babies (Pearl)
My Friends Tigger & Pooh (Jade) 小熊維尼與跳跳虎
My Gym Partner's a Monkey (Pearl)
My Life as a Teenage Robot (Pearl)
My Little Pony (Pearl)
My Little Pony: Friendship Is Magic (Jade)
Nature Cat (Pearl)
New Wacky Races (Pearl)
The New Adventures of Madeline (Pearl)
The New Adventures of Mighty Mouse and Heckle & Jeckle (Pearl)
The New Adventures of Winnie the Pooh (Pearl and Jade)
The New Archies (Pearl)
New Kids on the Block (Pearl)
The New Scooby and Scrappy-Doo Show (Pearl)
The New Scooby-Doo Mysteries (Pearl)
The New Three Stooges (Pearl)
The Oddball Couple (Pearl)
Old Wacky Races (Pearl)
Oswald (Pearl)
Paddington Bear (Pearl)
Paw Paws (Pearl)
Peabody's Improbable History (Pearl)
Peanuts
Peg + Cat (Pearl)
The Penguins of Madagascar (Pearl)
Penn Zero: Part-Time Hero (Jade) 潘恩·澤羅：兼職英雄
Pepper Ann (Pearl)
Phineas and Ferb (Pearl)
Piggsburg Pigs! (Pearl)
The Pink Panther (Pearl)
Pinky and the Brain (Pearl)
Pinky, Elmyra and the Brain (Pearl)
Police Academy (Pearl)
Popples (Pearl)
Pound Puppies (Pearl)
A Pup Named Scooby-Doo (Pearl)
Quack Pack (Pearl)
Quick Draw McGraw (Pearl)
Rambo: The Force of Freedom (Pearl)
Rainbow Brite (Pearl)
The Real Ghostbusters (Pearl)
Recess (Pearl)
The Ren & Stimpy Show (Pearl)
Richie Rich (Pearl)
Ring Raiders (Pearl)
Road Rovers (Pearl)
Rocko's Modern Life (Pearl)
Rod Rocket (Pearl)
Rolie Polie Olie (Pearl)
Rubik the Amazing Cube (Pearl)
Rude Dog and the Dweebs (Pearl)
Sabrina: The Animated Series (Pearl)
Samurai Jack (Pearl)
The Savage Dragon (Pearl)
Sealab 2020 (Pearl)
The Shnookums and Meat Funny Cartoon Show (Pearl)
The Secret Lives of Waldo Kitty (Pearl)
Secret Millionaires Club
Sherlock Holmes in the 22nd Century (Pearl)
She-Ra: Princess of Power (Pearl)
Sid the Science Kid (Pearl)
SilverHawks (Pearl and Jade)
The Simpsons (Jade & Pearl)
Sitting Ducks (Pearl)
Sky Commanders (Pearl)
Slimer! And the Real Ghostbusters (Pearl)
The Smurfs (Pearl and Jade) 藍精靈
Snorks (Pearl)
Sofia the First (Pearl)
Sonic Underground (Pearl)
South Park (Jade) 衰仔樂園
Space Ghost (Pearl)
Spider-Man (Pearl)
SpongeBob SquarePants (Pearl)
The Spooktacular New Adventures of Casper (Pearl)
Stanley (Pearl)
Star vs. The Forces of Evil (J2)
Star Wars: Clone Wars (Pearl)
Street Sharks (Pearl)
Stuart Little (Pearl)
Super Friends (Pearl)
Super Robot Monkey Team Hyperforce Go! (Jade) 超級機器人猴子隊超力去！
Sylvester and Tweety Mysteries (Pearl)
SWAT Kats: The Radical Squadron (Pearl and Jade) 霹靂特警貓
T.O.T.S. (Pearl)
TaleSpin (Pearl)
Tarzan, Lord of the Jungle (Pearl)
Teenage Mutant Ninja Turtles (Pearl and Jade) 龜之忍者
Teen Titans (Pearl)
Terrytoons (Pearl)
Thomas Edison's Secret Lab (Pearl)
ThunderCats (Pearl and Jade)
ThunderCats (Pearl)
Time Warp Trio (Pearl)
Timeless Tales from Hallmark (Pearl)
Tiny Toon Adventures (Pearl and Jade)
The Tom and Jerry Comedy Show (Pearl)
Tom and Jerry on Pearl (Pearl - November 20, 1967-December 29, 1989)
Toonsylvania (Pearl)
The Transformers (Jade)
True and the Rainbow Kingdom
T.U.F.F. Puppy (Jade and J2)
UBOS (Pearl)
VeggieTales (Pearl)
The Wacky World of Tex Avery (Pearl)
Walt Disney's Mickey and Donald (Pearl)
Warner Bros. Cartoons (Pearl)
What-a-Mess (Pearl)
What's New Scooby-Doo? (Pearl)
Where's Wally? (Pearl)
Wild Kratts (Pearl)
Will the Real Jerry Lewis Please Sit Down (Pearl)
Wild West C.O.W.-Boys of Moo Mesa (Pearl)
The Woody Woodpecker Show (Pearl)
The Wuzzles (Pearl)
X-Men: Evolution (Pearl)
The Yogi Bear Show (Pearl)
Yogi's Treasure Hunt (Pearl)
Yo, Yogi! (Pearl)
Zazoo U (Pearl)
The Zeta Project (Pearl)
¡Mucha Lucha! (Pearl)

Australian cartoons
Bananas in Pyjamas (Pearl)
The Berenstain Bears (Pearl)
Berry Bees (Pearl)
Bluey (Pearl)
Bright Sparks (Pearl)
Dennis and Gnasher (Pearl)
The Greatest Tune on Earth (Pearl)
Pearlie (Pearl)
Sea Princesses (Pearl)
Tabaluga (Pearl)

Belgian cartoons
Ovide Video (Pearl)
The Smurfs (Pearl and Jade) 藍精靈
Snorks (Pearl)

Brazilian cartoons
Oswaldo (Pearl)
Paper Port (Pearl)
Sea Princesses (Pearl)

British cartoons
64 Zoo Lane (Pearl)
The Adventures of Abney & Teal (Pearl)
Albie (Pearl)
Alias the Jester (Pearl)
The Amazing World of Gumball (Pearl)
Andy Pandy (Pearl)
Angelina Ballerina 老鼠仔與芭蕾舞 (Pearl and Jade)
The Animal Shelf (Pearl)
The Animals of Farthing Wood (Pearl)
Animated Tales of the World 童心看世界 (Jade)
Avenger Penguins (Pearl)
Bananaman (Pearl)
Ben and Holly's Little Kingdom (Pearl)
Best Bugs Forever (Pearl)
The Big Knights (Pearl)
Bimble's Bucket (Pearl)
The Blunders (Pearl)
Budgie the Little Helicopter (Jade)
Captain Zed and the Zee Zone (Pearl)
Charlie Chalk (Pearl)
Chuggington (Pearl)
City of Friends (Pearl)
Cockleshell Bay (Pearl)
Count Duckula (Pearl)
The Cramp Twins (Pearl)
Creepy Crawlies (Pearl)
Dan Dare: Pilot of the Future (Pearl)
Danger Mouse (Pearl)
Dennis and Gnasher (Pearl)
DinoCity (Pearl)
Dino Babies (Pearl)
Doris (Pearl)
The Dreamstone (Pearl and Jade)
Fantomcat (Pearl)
Fifi and the Flowertots (Pearl)
The Further Adventures of SuperTed (Pearl)
Gaspard & Lisa (Pearl)
Get Squiggling (Pearl)
Grizzly Tales for Gruesome Kids (Pearl)
Hana's Helpline
Hey Duggee (Pearl)
Hilltop Hospital (Pearl)
Humf (Pearl)
Jimbo and the Jet Set (Pearl)
JoJo & Gran Gran (Pearl)
King Rollo 廣東話配音 (Jade)
Kiri and Lou (Pearl)
The Large Family (Pearl)
Make Way for Noddy 小司機Noddy (Pearl and Jade)
Maisy (Pearl)
Mike the Knight (Pearl)
Molly's Gang (Pearl)
Noah's Island (Pearl)
Noddy (Pearl)
Noddy's Toyland Adventures (Pearl)
Pablo the Little Red Fox (Pearl)
The Perishers (Pearl)
Poddington Peas (Pearl)
The Pondles (Pearl)
Olive the Ostrich (Pearl)
Olivia (Pearl)
Olly the Little White Van (Pearl)
Operavox: The Animated Operas (Pearl)
Paddington Bear (Pearl)
Peppa Pig (Pearl)
Pigeon Street (Pearl)
The Pondles (Pearl)
Roary the Racing Car (Pearl)
Rotten Ralph (Pearl)
Rubbadubbers (Pearl)
School of Roars (Pearl)
Sea Princesses (Pearl)
The Secret Show (Pearl)
Shakespeare: The Animated Tales (Pearl)
Shaun the Sheep 超級無敵羊咩咩 (Pearl)
Sherlock Holmes in the 22nd Century (Pearl)
The Shoe People (Pearl and Jade)
Simon in the Land of Chalk Drawings (Pearl)
Sooty's Amazing Adventures (Pearl)
Supertato (Pearl)
Tales of Little Grey Rabbit (Pearl)
The Three Friends and Jerry (Pearl)
Thomas and Friends (Pearl)
Tilly and Friends (Pearl)
Timmy Time (Pearl)
Tinga Tinga Tales
Tiny Planets (Pearl)
Tree Fu Tom (Pearl)
The Twins (Pearl)
Where's Wally? (Pearl)
Wilf the Witch's Dog (Pearl)
William's Wish Wellingtons (Pearl)
Willo the Wisp (Pearl)
The Wind in the Willows (Pearl)
The World of Peter Rabbit and Friends (Pearl)
Yakka Dee! (Pearl)

Canadian cartoons
The Adventures of Teddy Ruxpin (Pearl)
The Amazing Spiez! (Pearl)
Angela Anaconda (Pearl)
Atomic Betty (Jade) 原子貝蒂
Babar and the Adventures of Badou (Pearl)
The Backyardigans (Pearl)
Beetlejuice (Pearl)
Being Ian (J2) 是IAN
The Berenstain Bears (Pearl)
Braceface (Pearl)
The Busy World of Richard Scarry (Pearl and Jade)
C.L.Y.D.E. (Pearl)
The Care Bears (Pearl)
The Cramp Twins (Pearl)
Creepschool (Pearl)
Cybersix (Jade & HDJ)
Eckhart (Pearl)
Eek! the Cat (Pearl)
Family Dog (Pearl)
Franklin and Friends (Pearl)
Free Willy (Pearl)
Flying Rhino Junior High (Pearl)
George Shrinks (Pearl)
Inspector Gadget (Pearl)
Inuk (Pearl)
Jacob Two-Two (Pearl)
Kaput and Zösky (Pearl)
Kid vs. Kat (J2) 男孩和冤家貓
King
Lilly the Witch (Pearl)
Madeline (Pearl)
Mike the Knight (Pearl)
Miss Spider's Sunny Patch Friends (Pearl)
Mona the Vampire (Pearl)
Monster Buster Club (Pearl)
Mudpit (Pearl)
My Friend Rabbit (Pearl)
My Little Pony: Friendship Is Magic (Jade)
Oh No! It's an Alien Invasion (Pearl)
Oswaldo (Pearl)
Ovide Video (Pearl)
Pearlie (Pearl)
Peg + Cat (Pearl)
Polly Pocket (Pearl)
The Raccoons (Pearl)
ReBoot (Jade)
Rolie Polie Olie (Pearl)
Sagwa, the Chinese Siamese Cat (Jade) 傻瓜貓
The Smoggies (Pearl and Jade) 大自然環保寶
Stickin' Around (Pearl)
Street Sharks (Pearl)
Toot and Puddle
True and the Rainbow Kingdom
The Twins (Pearl)
UBOS (Pearl)
What's With Andy? (Pearl)
Yvon of the Yukon (J2) 伊万育空地區

Chilean cartoons
31 minutos
Ozie Boo!: Save The Planet
Zumbastico Fantastico
Con Que Suenas
La tortuga Taruga
Paper Port (Pearl)
Pulentos

Dutch cartoons
Alfred J. Kwak (Jade)
The Bluffers (Pearl)
Miffy (Pearl)
Moomin (Jade)
Star Street: The Adventures of the Star Kids (Jade)
Wowser (Jade) 零蛋多毛狗

French cartoons
64 Zoo Lane (Pearl)
The Amazing Spiez! (Pearl)
Angelo Rules (Pearl)
The Animals of Farthing Wood (Pearl)
Babar and the Adventures of Badou (Pearl)
Barbapapa (Pearl)
Best Bugs Forever (Pearl)
The Busy World of Richard Scarry (Pearl and Jade)
C.L.Y.D.E. (Pearl)
Clémentine (Pearl)
Code Lyoko (Pearl)
Colargol (Jade) 小熊杰里米
Creepschool (Pearl)
Gadget Boy & Heather (Pearl)
Gaspard & Lisa (Pearl)
Gawayn (Jade)
Geronimo Stilton (Pearl)
Grizzy and the Lemmings (Pearl) 大笨熊與吱吱鼠
Dennis the Menace (Pearl)
Denver, the Last Dinosaur (Pearl and Jade)
Dragon Flyz (Jade)
Flying Rhino Junior High (Pearl)
The Get Along Gang (Pearl)
Heathcliff and the Catillac Cats (Pearl)
Hilltop Hospital (Pearl)
The Hydronauts (Pearl)
Inspector Gadget (Pearl)
Inuk (Pearl)
Kaput and Zösky (Pearl)
The Large Family (Pearl)
The Legend of Calamity Jane (Pearl)
The Littles (Pearl)
Lucky Luke (Pearl)
Madeline (Pearl)
Mona the Vampire (Pearl)
Monster Buster Club (Pearl)
Nate is Late (Pearl)
Nick & Perry (Pearl)
Oggy and the Cockroaches (Pearl)
Once Upon a Time... Life
Once Upon a Time... The Explorers
Oscar's Oasis (Pearl)
Pablo the Little Red Fox (Pearl)
Pirate Family (Pearl)
Popples (Pearl)
Robotboy (Jade)
Rolie Polie Olie (Pearl)
The Smoggies (Pearl and Jade) 大自然環保寶
Space Goofs (Pearl)
Spartakus and the Sun Beneath the Sea (Pearl)
Tales of Tatonka
Talis and the Thousand Tasks (Pearl)
Titeuf (Pearl)
Trust Me, I'm a Genie (Pearl)
What's With Andy? (Pearl)
Zig & Sharko (Pearl)

Finnish cartoons
Moomin (Jade)

German cartoons
Best Bugs Forever (Pearl)
Bill Body: Crazy World of Sports (Pearl)
The Hydronauts (Pearl)
Lilly the Witch (Pearl)
Lisa (Pearl)
Lucky Luke (Pearl)
Maya the Honey Bee (Pearl)
Nick & Perry (Pearl)
Pirate Family (Pearl)
Tabaluga (Pearl)
The Three Friends and Jerry (Pearl)

Chinese cartoons
The Olympic Adventures of Fuwa 福娃奧運漫遊記

Korean cartoons
Baby Shark's Big Show! (Pearl)
Oscar's Oasis (Pearl)
Pororo the Little Penguin (Jade) 冰鎮企鵝仔
Restol, The Special Rescue Squad
Tai Chi Chasers (Jade) 太極千字文

Indian cartoons
Berry Bees (Pearl)
Motu Patlu (Jade) 摩都伯德祿
Oswaldo (Pearl)
Raju the Rickshaw (Pearl)

Italian cartoons
Berry Bees (Pearl)
Geronimo Stilton (Pearl)
Sherlock Hound (Jade)
Winx Club (Jade) 魔法學園

Irish cartoons
The Amazing World of Gumball (Pearl)
Berry Bees (Pearl)
Dino Babies
Lilly the Witch (Pearl)
Lily's Driftwood Bay (Pearl)
Pic Me (Pearl)
Skunk Fu! (Jade) 功夫臭鼬

Japanese cartoons (Non-anime)
Galaxy High
The Littles
ThunderCats
Timberwood Tales
The Transformers

Kenyan cartoons
Tinga Tinga Tales

Malaysian cartoons
BoBoiBoy on Pearl (Pearl; March 16, 2011-August 21, 2016)
BoBoiBoy Galaxy (Pearl; December 20, 2016-present)

Mexican cartoons
Amigo and Friends

New Zealand cartoons
Oscar and Friends (Pearl)

Russian cartoons
Animated Tales of the World 童心看世界 (Jade)
DinoCity (Pearl)
Kid-E-Cats (Pearl)
Kikoriki 爆趣科學Pin碼 (Jade)
Masha and the Bear (Pearl)

Scottish cartoons
Animated Tales of the World 童心看世界 (Jade)

Spanish cartoons
Animated Tales of the World 童心看世界 (Jade)
Sea Princesses (Pearl)
The Cobi Troupe 高比 (Jade)
Mort and Phil (Jade)

Swedish cartoons
Creepschool (Pearl)
Lisa (Pearl)
Moomin (Jade)
The Three Friends and Jerry (Pearl)

Swiss cartoons
Bill Body: Crazy World of Sports (Pearl)

Welsh cartoons
Animated Tales of the World 童心看世界 (Jade)
The Further Adventures of SuperTed (Pearl)
Hana's Helpline
Operavox: The Animated Operas (Pearl)
Shakespeare: The Animated Tales (Pearl)

Jamboree shows

TV charity shows
Gala Spectacular 星光熠熠耀保良 - a charity show for Po Leung Kuk, shown in September every year
Golden Star Anniversary
Pok Oi Charity Show 博愛歡樂傳萬家 - a charity show for Pok Oi Hospitals' Group, shown in March every year
SuperStar Charity Concert
Tung Wah Charity Show 歡樂滿東華 - a charity show for Tung Wah Group of Hospitals, shown in December every year
TVB Benefit Variety show for New York University (NYU) Downtown Hospital - New York, USA
Yan Chai Charity Show 慈善星輝仁濟夜 - a charity show for Yan Chai Hospitals' Group, shown in January every year

Major jamboree shows
TVB All Star Challenge 星光熠熠勁爭輝
TVB Anniversary Awards 萬千星輝頒獎典禮 - an awards show celebrating the year's best in TVB programming. Hosted by Carol Cheng.
TVB Anniversary Special 萬千星輝賀台慶 - a show celebrating the establishment of TVB, shown on November 19 each year
Miss Chinese International Pageant 國際中華小姐競選 - an annual beauty pageant with delegates of Chinese descent from around the world competing for the title of Miss Chinese International
Miss Hong Kong Pageant 香港小姐競選 - an annual beauty pageant that crowns Miss Hong Kong, who will then represent Hong Kong to compete in Miss World and Miss Chinese International
Mr. Hong Kong Contest 香港先生選舉 - the male counterpart of Miss Hong Kong, this contest chooses a male contestant to crown as Mr. Hong Kong
New Talent Singing Awards International Finals 全球華人新秀歌唱大賽 - an annual singing contest with contestants around the world vying for first place to win a record contract. Hosted by Carol Cheng.

Variety shows
Beautiful Cooking (2006)
Enjoy Yourself Tonight (E.Y.T.) 歡樂今宵 (1967)
Super Trio Series 獎門人系列 - long running game show since 1994. Hosted by Eric Tsang, Jerry Lamb (Season 1-7), Jordan Chan (first season only) and Chin Kar-lok (second season onwards). The eighth season had Jerry Lamb replaced by Wong Cho Lam and Louis Yuen, because he went to seek a career opportunity at a rival network, CTV Atlantic.

Game shows
Weakest Link 一筆 OUT 消 - Cantonese version of the quiz programme asking general knowledge questions to participants, with their majority evicting themselves out one by one until two are left to answer questions, determining who's the winner out of the two; hosted by Carol Cheng.
Minutes to Fame 殘酷一叮 - a game show that give time to the participants for their show; the longer time they keep, the more chance to win. This game is similar to Pop Idol and American Idol and is  hosted by Hacken Lee and Joey Leung.
Justice For All 百法百眾 - a game show that gives two documents about the laws of Hong Kong to the participants, and ask them questions about the document; they can choose in two answers. Hosted by Carol Cheng.
15/16
Deal or No Deal 一擲千金
Identity 亮相
Are You Smarter Than a 5th Grader? 係咪小兒科 (2008)
Outsmart 財智達人 - a game show that shoot with high-definition technology. Hosted by Carol Cheng.(2009、2012)
Checkerboard Jackpot 逐格鬥 - a game show that shoot with high-definition technology. Hosted by Carol Cheng.(2010)
The Law Society of Hong Kong Law Week Specials 知法守法 - a game show that shoot with high-definition technology, content surrounding the laws of Hong Kong. Hosted by Carol Cheng.(2011)
Treasure Hunt At Double Cove 迎海尋珍奪寶 - a game show that shoot with high-definition technology. Hosted by Carol Cheng.(2012)

News programmes
Hong Kong and World News
Good Morning Hong Kong (香港早晨) at TVB Jade
Noon News (午間新聞) at TVB Jade
News at 6:30 (六點半新聞報道) at TVB Jade
News at 7:30 (七點半新聞報道) at TVB Pearl
News File (新聞簡報) at TVB Jade & TVB Pearl (1981 - 1993)
News Roundup (晚間新聞) at TVB Jade & TVB Pearl 
Putonghua News (普通話新聞報道) at TVB Pearl (1993 - 2016) and TVB J5 (2016 - Present)
World Animation Magazine 世界動畫雜誌 World Animation and Cartoon News Report outlook (TVB Pearl)
The Pearl Report 明珠檔案
Global Watch 財經多國度
Market Open 開市第一擊
Pearl News Magazine 國際視線
Finance Magazine 財經透視  (TVB Jade)
Money Magazine 財經雜誌 - Hong Kong and world financial news report outlook (TVB Pearl)
Sunday Report 星期日檔案 - features stories from Chinese and Hong Kong societies affecting people today
News Magazine 新聞透視 - Hong Kong political news round table

Information programmes
Be My Guest 志雲飯局 (2006)
Dolce Vita 港生活‧港享受 (2006)
Hong Kong Live 香港直播
Pleasure and Leisure
So Good
Vanishing Glacier

Sports programmes
CFL on TVB
MLB on TVB
MLS on TVB
NBA on TVB
NFL on TVB
NHL on TVB
Summer Olympic Games (1984-)
Winter Olympic Games (1984, 2014-)
 體育世界 (1980-2018)
FIFA World Cup (1980-2006, 2014)
Macau Grand Prix at TVB Jade & formerly TVB Pearl (1967-)

Entertainment programmes
Discontinued/cancelled programmes
Entertainment News Watch 娛樂新聞眼
Jade Starbiz 娛樂大搜查
K-100

Currently on-air programmes
E-Buzz 娛樂 直播
Scoop  東張西望

Music shows
 360 Boundless Music (360° 音樂無邊)
 Children's Song Awards Presentation (兒歌金曲頒獎典禮)
 Children's Song Corner (兒歌通訊站)
 Global Rhythm (無間音樂)
 Gold Disc Awards Presentation (金唱片頒獎典禮) - awards the top 30 selling gold and platinum artists, according to sales figures
 Jade Solid Gold (勁歌金曲) - features live performances from various artists and the countdown of the top 25 or 20 albums sold during the week
 Jade Solid Gold Best Ten Music Awards Presentation (十大勁歌金曲頒獎典禮)
 Jade Solid Gold Song Video Corner (金曲挑戰站) - features music videos from various artists' top-selling albums and/or singles
 Minutes to Fame - a show where people sing to get money; they can get HK$100  every second
 Music@GIV (音樂潮@giv) - music videos, live performance from various artist and viewer shoutouts and feedback in a half-hour live programme
 Ultimate Jade Solid Gold (勁歌推介) - features the best music videos of the best top-selling albums and/or singles
 The Voice (超級巨聲) - a reality show type singing competition that eliminates contestants slowly until a winner is declared at the end of each season

Kids' shows

100 Deeds for Eddie McDowd
3-2-1 Contact
430 Shuttle 430 穿梭機
Ace Lightning
The Adventures of Rupert Bear
Agent Z and the Penguin from Mars
After School ICU 放學ICU
Animals in Action
Art Attack
Aquila
Barney & Friends
Beakman's World
Big Bag
The Big Bang
Big John, Little John
Big Kids
Bill Nye the Science Guy
Bits and Bytes
The Box of Delights
Boy Dominic
The Boy from Andromeda
The Boy Merlin
Button Moon
Catweazle
The Children of Green Knowe
Children of the Dog Star
Chocky
Chocky's Challenge
Chocky's Children
C.A.B.
DaDa DeDe Melody DaDa DeDe 精靈樂園
DaDa DeDe Petit Chefs DaDa DeDe 小名廚
Dinosaur Detectives
Dodger, Bonzo and the Rest
Don't Eat the Neighbours
Do It
Dramarama
The Edison Twins
The Electric Company
Fimbles
Finger Tips
Flash Fax 閃電傳真機
The Genie from Down Under
The Giblet Boys
Ginger Gap
Ghostwriter
The Ghost of Faffner Hall
Gophers!
Hannah Montana
Here Comes Mumfie
Hero to Zero
The Hoobs
Iconicles
It's a Big Big World
Jack's Big Music Show
Jackanory Junior
The Jersey
Jim Henson's Mother Goose Stories
Kids Click 至NET小人類
The Kids of Degrassi Street
Kidsongs
Korg: 70,000 B.C.
Lassie
Little Sir Nicholas
Lizzie McGuire
The Longhouse Tales
The Magician's House
The New Mickey Mouse Club
Mike and Angelo
Moondial
Monster Squad
Mousercise
Munch Bunch
My Animal and Me
My Best Friend is an Alien
Nina and the Neurons
The New Ghostwriter Mysteries
The New Mickey Mouse Club
Nobody's Hero
Nobody's House
The Noddy Shop
Old MacDonald's Sing-A-Long Farm
The Paper Lads
Patrick's Planet
Pollyanna
Pullover
Rentaghost
The Return of the Psammead
Rod, Jane and Freddy
The Roly Mo Show
Round the Twist
Scheewe Art Workshop
Sea Urchins
The Secret World of Alex Mack
The Secrets of Isis
Secrets of the Animal Kingdom
Serious Amazon
Serious Desert
Serious Jungle
Sesame English
Sesame Park
Sesame Street
Shazam!
Show Me Show Me
Sky Trackers
Sooty & Co.
Soy Luna
The Sooty Show
Splash
Square One Television
Stig of the Dump
The Suite Life of Zack & Cody
Super Gran
Swallows and Amazons Forever!
Teletubbies
That's So Raven
Think Big天地
Tikkabilla
Tommy Zoom
The Tomorrow People
Topo Gigio
Tricky Business
Tweenies
T-Bag
Under the Mountain
Violetta 音樂情人夢 (Pearl, dubbed in English with Mandarin Subtitles)
The Wild House
Winx Club
Wonderstruck
Wumpa's World 沃帕的世界
Young Universe
Zach's Ultimate Guide
Zap Rap (Pearl, early 1990s)

Movies

American movies
The Chipmunk Adventure (Pearl)
Barbie in the Nutcracker (Pearl)
Cool as Ice (Pearl)
Death Wish II (Pearl)
Dennis the Menace (Pearl)
Die Hard (Pearl)
Dumbo (Pearl)
High Spirits (Pearl)
Home for the Holidays (Pearl)
How to Train Your Dragon (Jade)
Indiana Jones and the Temple of Doom (Pearl)
A Kid in King Arthur's Court (Pearl)
A League of Their Own (Pearl)
Money Train (Pearl)
The Nightmare Before Christmas (Pearl)
Perry Mason film series (Pearl)
Race for Your Life, Charlie Brown (Pearl)
Rock-a-Doodle (Pearl)
Royal Wedding (Pearl)
There Will Be Blood (Pearl)
Star Trek III: The Search for Spock (Pearl)
Star Wars film series (Jade)
The White Buffalo (Pearl)
Who Framed Roger Rabbit (Pearl)
Wreck-It Ralph (Pearl)

Australian movies
Crocodile Dundee (Pearl)
Dot and the Bunny (Pearl)
Dot and the Kangaroo (Pearl)
Mad Max (Pearl)
Mad Max Beyond Thunderdome (Pearl)
Mad Max 2 (Pearl)

British movies
High Spirits (Pearl)
Thunderbirds Are Go (Pearl)

Canadian movies
Barbie in the Nutcracker (Pearl)
Strange Brew (Pearl)

Irish movies
High Spirits (Pearl)

Japanese movies
Doraemon film series (Jade)
Final Fantasy: The Spirits Within 最終幻想：太空戰士 (Jade)
Studio Ghibli film series (Jade)

Malaysian movies
BoBoiBoy: The Movie (Pearl; August 27, 2016-present on some days or months)

TVB programmes
 
TVB
 List